Judi West (born December 15, 1942) is an American actress, best known for her supporting role opposite Jack Lemmon in the comedy film The Fortune Cookie (1966).

Biography
Judi West acted in a few films in the 1960s and also appeared in television in the 1960s through the early 1980s, including the role of April Lavery in the 1971 Gunsmoke episode "Laverly" (S16E22). Her main film appearances include:

 The Fortune Cookie, directed by Billy Wilder (US, 1966) - Sandy Hinkle
 La Donna, il sesso e il superuomo, directed by Sergio Spina (Italy, 1967) - Deborah Sands
 A Man Called Gannon, directed by James Goldstone (US, 1968) - Beth Cross

She had earlier worked on the Broadway stage including A Family Affair (1962) and She Loves Me (1963-1964).

Married from 1971 to 1989 to actor John Rubinstein, she is the mother of actor Michael Weston.

References

External links
 
 At opening of Michael Weston's film The Last Kiss (2006).

1942 births
Living people
American film actresses
American television actresses
21st-century American women